The Dr. George Ashley House is a historic house located at 40 W. 2nd North in Paris, Idaho. The house was built in the early 1890s for Dr. George Ashley, Jr., a local physician who established the Bear Lake Valley's first hospital. The house's Queen Anne design was likely inspired by Paris' J. R. Shepherd House. The front porch features an Eastlake-inspired spindlework balustrade and eave, pierced brackets, and ring-and-ball supporting columns. The ell to the left of the front door has a tent roof, an uncommon roof form for an ell-shaped frame house.

The house was added to the National Register of Historic Places on November 18, 1982.

References

Houses on the National Register of Historic Places in Idaho
Queen Anne architecture in Idaho
Houses in Bear Lake County, Idaho
National Register of Historic Places in Bear Lake County, Idaho